Ushuaïa Ibiza Beach Hotel is a brand belonging to the Spanish Palladium Hotel Group. The brand was founded in 2011 after the meeting of Abel Matutes and Yann Pissenem. The brand includes 2 hotels: the first one is called The Ushuaïa Club and was opened in 2011 on the Balearic island of Ibiza. The second hotel, called The Ushuaïa Tower, opened a year later in 2012. Both hotels are located in Platja d'en Bossa, Ibiza.

The club has a capacity of over 7,000 people, and is one of the largest clubs in Ibiza. The club has hosted many notable DJs.

History

In July 2019, the club hosted Swedish House Mafia during their Save the World Reunion Tour, after the group announced the date in April of this year. The club was formerly called Hotel Fiesta Club until it was transformed into Ushuaïa.

The club was also featured in the video for the David Guetta/Bebe Rexha song, "I'm Good (Blue)".

Awards and nominations

DJ Magazine's top 100 Clubs

International Dance Music Awards

International Nightlife Association's Top 100 Clubs

Hï Ibiza
After Space closed in 2016, Ushuaïa Entertainment bought ft gfc tx gclub and reopened it a year later under the name Hï Ibiza. The clubhouse includes a club and a theater, as well as three open-air areas. In 2018, Hï Ibiza hosted the 20th anniversary of the DJ Awards.

Awards and nominations

DJ Magazine's top 100 Clubs

International Nightlife Association's Top 100 Clubs

Notes

References

Hotel chains in Spain
Hospitality companies of Spain
Hotels in Ibiza
Electronic dance music venues
Hotels established in 2011
Hotel buildings completed in 2011